Bethnal were a British rock band formed in 1972.  In 1978, they released two albums on Vertigo Records: Dangerous Times, produced by Kenny Laguna; and Crash Landing; produced by Jon Astley and Phil Chapman, 
with special thanks to Pete Townshend. They supported Hawkwind on their 1977 UK tour and, after disbanding, three of the members formed part of the backing band for the 1981 album Hype by former Hawkwind frontman Robert Calvert.

Key members were George Csapo (vocals, keyboards, violin), Pete Dowling (drums), Nick Michaels (guitar) and Everton Williams (bass).

References

External links
Discography on Punkygibbon

British rock music groups
Musical groups established in 1972